Sir Charles Thomas-Stanford, 1st Baronet (3 April 1858 – 7 March 1932), born Charles Thomas, was a British Conservative Party politician from Brighton. He sat in the House of Commons from 1914 to 1922.

Early life and family 

The son of David Collet Thomas, from Hove, he was educated at the Highgate School and at Oriel College, Oxford, where he graduated with a BA degree in 1881. He was called to the bar at the Inner Temple in 1882, but did not practice.

In 1897 he married Ellen Stanford, the daughter and heiress of William Stanford of Preston Park, Sussex, and widow of Vere Benett-Stanford, the former MP for Shaftesbury. In the same year he changed his name by royal licence to Thomas-Stanford.

Career 
Thomas-Stanford became a Justice of the Peace (J.P.) for Brighton, and served as Mayor of Brighton in 1910–11 and 1912–14, becoming an alderman by 1914.

Thomas-Stanford was elected as a member of parliament (MP) for Brighton in June 1914 at an unopposed by-election following the resignation of the Conservative MP John Gordon. He was re-elected in 1918 as a Coalition Conservative (i.e. a supporter of the coalition government led by the Liberal David Lloyd George), and stood down from Parliament at the 1922 general election.

In 1922 he donated Lewes Castle to the Sussex Archaeological Society, of which he was a long-serving chairman.

Thomas-Stanford was made a baronet on the 1929 New Year Honours and the title was conferred on 8 May 1929.

He died aged 73 on 7 March 1932 at his home Preston Manor, Brighton, which was bequeathed to Brighton Corporation.

References

External links 

1858 births
1932 deaths
Conservative Party (UK) MPs for English constituencies
English justices of the peace
UK MPs 1910–1918
UK MPs 1918–1922
Baronets in the Baronetage of the United Kingdom
People from Brighton
Councillors in East Sussex
Mayors of places in East Sussex
Members of the Inner Temple
People educated at Highgate School
Alumni of Oriel College, Oxford